Clive is a village and civil parish in Shropshire, England, United Kingdom.

Clive is situated around the west side of Grinshill Hill. Grinshill sandstone, from the nearby quarry at Grinshill is used throughout the village for building material from walls and houses to the village church.

The English Restoration dramatist William Wycherley was born at Clive.

Travel

Road
Clive is situated just off the A49, and the  B5476.

Rail
The village is served by Yorton railway station, located on the Welsh Marches Line between Shrewsbury and Wem. The majority of services are between Shrewsbury and Crewe, operated by Transport for Wales, as well as some additional services to Manchester Piccadilly, Hereford, Cardiff Central, Swansea and Carmarthen.

Bus
The village is served by the 511 bus route, operated by Arriva Midlands North, which runs between Shrewsbury and Whitchurch via Wem. Some services terminate in Wem and do not continue to Whitchurch.

Community life
In the centre of the village is All Saints church  which holds regular services. The vicar is Paul Cawthorne.

Clive Church of England primary school is situated halfway up Grinshill Hill.

The village is often used by the local Hunt, The North Shropshire Foxhounds, who from time to time there hold meets around the village.

The Post office on the High Street remains a central point for the community, while regular evening classes, from computing to weaving, are held in the village hall.

The village is served by a monthly news letter with input from the local community.

Local services
The village is within walking distance of two pubs, The Inn at Grinshill and The Railway Inn.

The village is also served by a mechanics, car dealership, bowling club, village club, and a number of small businesses, such as decorators and electricians, are based in and around the village.

See also
Listed buildings in Clive, Shropshire

References

External links

Villages in Shropshire
Civil parishes in Shropshire